Ian Macpherson (1905–1944) was a Scottish writer from Leslie Place, Forres, Moray, Scotland. He graduated from Aberdeen University in 1928 with a first-class honours degree in English. His first novel, Shepherds Calendar, was published in 1931. The book tells of a young man's growth to maturity in a farming community dominated by hard toil and the influence of the seasons.

Wild Harbour tells of the world destroyed by a future war, forebodings of which were already discernible in Europe. Macpherson died in a motorcycle accident in 1944.

Novels
 Shepherds' Calendar (1931), 
 Land of Our Fathers (1933)
 Pride in the Valley (1936), 
 Wild Harbour (1936),

Further reading
Gifford, Douglas (1982), In Search of the Scottish Renaissance: The Reprinting of Scottish Fiction, in Cencrastus No. 9, Summer 1982, pp. 26 – 30,

References 

Canongate Books
 1001 Books You Must Read Before You Die, ABC Books, Sydney, 2006.

External links
The Literature of Scotland @ Google Books

1944 deaths
1905 births
Alumni of the University of Aberdeen
20th-century Scottish writers
Scottish novelists
Motorcycle road incident deaths
20th-century British novelists
Road incident deaths in the United Kingdom